Bernie Fuchs (October 29, 1932 – September 17, 2009) was an American illustrator known for advertising art, magazine illustration and portraiture, including for a series of U.S. postage stamps.

Biography
Fuchs was born in O'Fallon, Illinois on October 29, 1932. He grew up in humble circumstances with no father. His ambition was to be a trumpet player, but that ended after he lost three fingers on his right hand in an industrial accident the summer after he graduated from high school. Fuchs turned to art as a career, despite having had no formal art training. He enrolled in Washington University in St. Louis, Missouri, where he graduated in 1954.

His first job was illustrating car advertisements for New Center Studios, located first in the Fisher Bldg., then in the Penobscot Bldg in Detroit. Art Greenwald was the owner of the studio. It was the largest and most successful studio in Detroit in the 1950s and 1960s. A couple of the other illustrators were Chic Albertson and Donald Silverstein. Bernie was recognized immediately for his incredible talent and pulled in major accounts for Greenwald. Within a few years of moving to Detroit, Fuchs' opened the studio The Art Group, which specialized in work for the city's auto companies. In the late 1950s, Fuchs moved to Westport, Connecticut where he began doing illustrations for McCalls, Redbook, The Ladies Home Journal, Sports Illustrated and other magazines.

Fuchs was commissioned for the illustration of four U.S. postage stamps released in 1998. The stamps featured folk musicians Huddie "Leadbelly" Ledbetter, Woody Guthrie, Sonny Terry, and Josh White.  Fuchs also illustrated several children's picture books, including Ragtime Tumpie and Carolina Shout!, both written by Alan Schroeder.

He painted portraits of several U.S. Presidents, including John F. Kennedy, Lyndon Johnson, Gerald Ford, Jimmy Carter and Ronald Reagan, as well as of such athletes and celebrities such as Muhammad Ali, Arnold Palmer, Jack Nicklaus, Ted Koppel and Katharine Hepburn as well as illustrations of Carol Burnett for the title card for her show.

At age 76, he died September 17, 2009 of esophageal cancer at a Fairfield, Connecticut care facility.

Awards
Fuchs was the youngest illustrator ever elected to the Society of Illustrators Hall of Fame.

In 1991, Fuchs was named Sport Artist of the Year by the American Sport Art Museum and Archives.

The children's book Ragtime Tumpie by Fuchs and Alan Schroeder was cited as an American Library Association Notable Children's Book in 1989. It was also an International Reading Association Teachers' Choice.  Fuchs and Schroeder also collaborated on the 1994 picture book "Carolina Shout!"

Family
Fuchs married his high school sweetheart, Anna Lee Hesse. Together they raised three children: Cynthia, Derek, and Ellise.

See also
List of TV Guide covers

Notes

References
Heller, Steven. "Bernie Fuchs, Illustrator for Magazines and Advertisements, Dies at 76", The New York Times, September 21, 2009

External links

1932 births
2009 deaths
American illustrators
Deaths from cancer in Connecticut
Deaths from esophageal cancer
People from St. Clair County, Illinois
Washington University in St. Louis alumni
People from Fairfield, Connecticut